Boerum Hill (pronounced  ) is a small neighborhood in the northwestern portion of the New York City borough of Brooklyn, bounded by Schermerhorn Street to the north and Fourth Avenue to the east. The western border is variously given as either Smith or Court Streets, and Warren or Wyckoff Streets as the southern edge.

Smith Street and Atlantic Avenue are the neighborhood's main commercial districts. The Brooklyn High School of the Arts is in the neighborhood on Dean Street and Third Avenue. The neighborhood is part of Brooklyn Community District 2 and is served by the NYPD's 84th Precinct.

History

Boerum Hill is named for the colonial farm of the Boerum family, which occupied most of the area during early Dutch settlement. According to the 1790 census, John Boerum's family owned at least two enslaved people.

Most of the housing in Boerum Hill consists of three-story row houses built between 1840 and 1870. Despite the "hill" in the name, the neighborhood is relatively flat; some parts sit atop former marshes that bordered Gowanus Creek. In the 1950s, all the neighborhoods south of Atlantic Avenue and west of Prospect Park were known generically as South Brooklyn. Boerum Hill in particular was sometimes called "North Gowanus." The name "Boerum Hill" was coined in early 1964 by Boerum Hill Association founder Helen Buckler, referencing the name of the colonial farmers.

From the early 1970s until about 2003, Boerum Hill was populated mostly by working class and middle-class African-American and Puerto Rican families. In recent decades, since about the late 1990s, gentrification has changed the neighborhood to one of mostly upper-class individuals, though working-class families still reside in the immediate area.

In the early twentieth century, many of the buildings were run as boarding houses. Nearby was the union hall for ironworkers, who came to the city to work on bridges and skyscrapers. The north end of Smith Street was the center of New York City's Mohawk community, who came mostly from Akwesasne and Kahnawake, Mohawk reserves in Quebec, Canada. (Akwesasne extends across national boundaries into New York state.) Many of the Mohawk men were ironworkers, while their wives worked at a variety of jobs and created the community for their families. For 50 years, the Mohawk families called their neighborhood "Little Caughnawaga," after the homeland of Kahnawake. Many families would travel back to Kahnawake in the summer.

The Boerum Hill Historic District was first recognized and designated by the New York City Landmarks Preservation Commission on November 20, 1973, after many years of advocacy by the Boerum Hill Association. The Boerum Hill Historic District was then listed on the National Register of Historic Places in 1983. Many of its buildings are landmarked.

In 2012, Boerum Hill had the sixth highest neighborhood median home prices among all New York City neighborhoods, and the highest of any neighborhood outside Manhattan.

Culture

Boerum Hill is known for its independent boutiques, restaurants and rows of brownstones. Boerum Hill is home of many artists who own art galleries in the neighborhood, including the "invisible dog" exhibition. Boerum Hill is home to many young families, and biking is popular in the neighborhood and nearby Prospect Park. The abundant cultural offerings (including The Invisible Dog Art Center, Roulette, Issue Project Room, and BAM), the thriving Smith Street restaurant row and Atlantic Avenue Design district.

The neighborhood has been featured in several contemporary creative works. It is the setting of Spike Lee's movie, Clockers (1995), which was filmed in the Gowanus Houses. It is the setting for two of Jonathan Lethem's novels: Motherless Brooklyn (1999), a crime mystery set on Bergen Street between Smith and Hoyt streets; and The Fortress of Solitude (2002), set primarily on one block in Boerum Hill (Dean Street between Nevins and Bond streets).

Library 
The Brooklyn Public Library (BPL)'s Pacific branch is at 25 Fourth Avenue near Pacific Street. Opened in 1905, it is Brooklyn's oldest Carnegie library.

Media 
WBAI 99.5 FM, a non-commercial, listener-supported radio station part of the Pacifica Network has studios and offices at 388 Atlantic Avenue.

Notable residents 
 Jonathan Ames (born 1964), author
 Jean-Michel Basquiat (1960–1988), artist
 Lilly Burns, producer
 Michael T. Cahill, Dean of Brooklyn Law School
 Paul Dano (born 1984), actor
 Shaun Donovan (born 1966), former US Secretary of Housing and Urban Development and Director of the Office of Management and Budget
 Duncan Hannah (1952-2002), artist and author
 Ethan Hawke (born 1970), actor
 Hugo Guinness (born 1959), artist and screenwriter
 Zoe Kazan (born 1983), actress
 Chuck Klosterman (born 1972), writer
 Heath Ledger (1979–2008), actor
 Jonathan Lethem (born 1964), writer, lived here as a child
 Emily Mortimer (born 1971), actress
 Alessandro Nivola (born 1972), actor
 Lynn Nottage (born 1964), playwright
 Sandra Oh (born 1971), actress
 Joan Osborne (born 1962), singer-songwriter
 Lana Parrilla (born 1977), actress
 Alex Rice (born 1972), actress
 Keri Russell (born 1976), actress
 Ryan Serhant (born 1984), actor, television personality, real estate agent
 Merritt Wever (born 1980), actress
 Michelle Williams (born 1980), actress

References

Further reading
 Article about Reaghan Tarbell, To Brooklyn and Back: A Mohawk Journey, PBS, 2 November 2009, documentary about Kahnawake Mohawk families in Brooklyn

External links
 

 
1964 establishments in New York City
Populated places established in 1964
Mohawk tribe
Native American history of New York (state)
Neighborhoods in Brooklyn